Sevenmile Mountain may be a summit:
 Sevenmile Mountain (Arizona) in Maricopa County, Arizona
 Sevenmile Mountain (Texas) in Bell County, Texas
 Sevenmile Mountain (Virginia) in Craig County, Virginia